The 1962 Massachusetts gubernatorial election was held on November 6, 1962. Former Executive Councilor Endicott Peabody defeated incumbent Governor John A. Volpe in the general election.

The election is notable as a demonstration of the political individualism of Italian Americans and historic lack of ethnic bloc voting among Americans of Italian descent, instead preferring to vote based on individual candidates and issues. John Volpe, just the second Massachusetts governor of Italian ancestry, lost his 1962 re-election campaign by a razor-thin 0.21%—a final margin that could be more than sufficiently explained by Volpe polling only 51% among the state's significant population of Italian Americans, roughly half of whom voted for the old-line Anglo-Saxon Protestant Endicott Peabody over a fellow ethnic.

Republican primary

Candidates
John Volpe, incumbent Governor

Results
Governor Volpe was unopposed for renomination.

Democratic primary

Candidates
Endicott Peabody, member of the Massachusetts Governor's Council
Clement A. Riley, auto registrar

Results

General election

Results
Peabody defeated Volpe by 4,431 votes. Peabody's slim margin of victory prompted a recount. On December 20, Volpe conceded the election to Peabody.

See also
 1961–1962 Massachusetts legislature

References

1962
Gubernatorial
Massachusetts
November 1962 events in the United States